The Rocca Malatestiana (Malatestian Stronghold) is a fortress in Cesena, Italy. The current structure is the third fortress built in the place, near the ruins of the two previous ones, of late-Roman and medieval age.

The  fortress, one of the most imposing in Romagna, has a court and two central towers, called the "Male" and the "Female". The Museum of Agriculture, located inside the latter, offers visitors a complete picture of rural life in Romagna over different ages, while the "Male Tower" hosts a permanent exhibition of Malatestian Ceramics.

See also

List of castles in Italy

Forts in Italy
Castles in Emilia-Romagna
Buildings and structures in Cesena
Museums in Emilia-Romagna